Paphiopedilum hennisianum is a species of orchid endemic to central Philippines (Panay, Negros islands of the Visayas).

References

External links 

hennisianum
Endemic orchids of the Philippines
Flora of the Visayas